Groupe Bigard is a French meat processing company. It owns half of all slaughterhouses in France It processes beef, mutton, and pork. Its best-known brandname in Charal.

Overview
The company was founded as Société commerciale des viandes by Jean-Paul Bigard in 1968. It became known as Groupe Bigard six years later, in 1974. 

The company is headquartered in Quimperlé, France. It owns half of all slaughterhouses in France. It sells meat under the brandnames of Charal, D'Anvial, Tendre et Plus, and Shems. Its best-known brandname is Charal.

As of 2015, Jean-Paul Bigard owns 90% of the company, with an estimated wealth of 350 million Euros. He serves as the President of the Syndicat National de l'Industrie des Viandes (SNIV) and the Syndicat National du Commerce du Porc (SNCP).

2015 French pork production crisis
In August 2015, both Groupe Bigard and its competitor, Cooperl Arc Atlantique, refused to accept the price set at the Marché du Porc Breton in Plérin, which is used as the norm across France, on the basis that it was too high in comparison with the price set by other European countries like Germany, where both companies also sell pork.

References

Food and drink companies established in 1968
Companies based in Brittany
Meat companies of France
French companies established in 1968